Palmas–Brigadeiro Lysias Rodrigues Airport  is the airport serving Palmas, Brazil. The airport is named after Brigadier Lysias Augusto Rodrigues (1896–1957), one of the founding figures of the Brazilian Air Force and crucial to the integration of Tocantins to Brazil via the passenger air services of the Brazilian Air Force.

It is operated by CCR.

History
The airport was commissioned on October 5, 2001. It has an area of 23,739,952.00m² which is enough to future expansions. The terminal has 12,300m² and a capacity for 2 100,000 passengers/year.

Previously operated by Infraero, on April 7, 2021 CCR won a 30-year concession to operate the airport.

Airlines and destinations

Access

See also

List of airports in Brazil

References

External links

Airports in Tocantins
Airports established in 2001
Palmas, Tocantins